Mireille Guiliano (born April 14, 1946, in Moyeuvre-Grande, France) is a French-American author and former corporate executive at LVMH.

Education
Mireille Guiliano was born in 1946 in Moyeuvre-Grande, France. She completed a year of her education as an exchange student in the United States and studied French and English literature at the Sorbonne Nouvelle (1966–1970) and received her master's degree. She also graduated as a translator/interpreter from the Institut Supérieur d'Interprétariat et de Traduction (ISIT).

Executive career
Guiliano began her career as a multi-lingual translator, including work for the United Nations. In 1979 she left the translation industry and joined the Champagne News and Information Bureau where she first began working with Veuve Clicquot. In 1984 the company asked her to create an American subsidiary, Clicquot, Inc. where she would become CEO in 1991. In this position she increased the market share of the wine from 1% 1984 and to 25% at the end of her tenure. In 2005 she joined the board of the James Beard Foundation and sat on the Executive Committee of Moet-Hennessy at LVMH. She retired from Clicquot in 2006 to become a full-time writer.

Writing career
Her book French Women Don’t Get Fat sold 450,000 copies between December 2004 and April 2005, and was translated into several dozen languages. Overall it sold more than three million copies within ten years. She then published the book French Women for All Seasons in 2006. In 2009 she released the book Women, Work & the Art of Savoir Faire: Business Sense & Sensibility, a life and career advice book that Publishers Weekly wrote uses "a sense of chic and fun absent in other leadership and career guides." 
In 2010 she then returned to the French Women series, releasing her book The French Women Don't Get Fat Cookbook. In 2013 she published the book French Women Don't Get Facelifts: The Secret of Aging with Style and Attitude, which focuses on "aging gracefully".  In 2014 she then released her book Meet Paris Oyster: A Love Affair with the Perfect Food, in which she advocated for a greater diversity of diet, and specifically discusses the consumption of shellfish in French culture.

The New York Times called Guiliano's work "eminently level headed" and noted that she included "reasonable thoughts about nutrition with a general endoresement of joie de vivre." Others have  criticized her work for promoting a stereotype of French women, failing to cite scientific literature on the causes of obesity in the United States, and promoting unhealthy attitudes towards food. Zoë Williams specifically criticized Guiliano's catchphrase "la moitié, s'il vous plaît" ("just give me half of that, please"). In 2007, Gawker.com ran an article consisting of anonymous employees of Guiliano's that criticized her management style and behavior. The San Francisco Chronicle called her first book "a blueprint for building a healthy attitude toward food and exercise," and The Daily Telegraph stated it was "beautifully written."

Personal
Guiliano' husband Edward Guiliano, is the President Emeritus of the New York Institute of Technology. She is the co-founder of the Guiliano Global Fellowship Program with her husband.

Books
French Women Don't Get Fat: The Secret of Eating for Pleasure 
French Women for All Seasons: A Year of Secrets, Recipes and Pleasure
Women, Work & The Art of Savoir Faire.
The French Women Don't Get Fat Cookbook
French Women Don't Get Facelifts: The Secret of Aging with Style and Attitude
Meet Paris Oyster: A Love Affair with the Perfect Food

See also
French paradox

References

External links
 Frenchwomendontgetfat.com - website to accompany the French Women books.
 Mireilleguiliano.com – author's website

1946 births
Living people
People from Moyeuvre-Grande
American food writers
French food writers
LVMH people
American women business executives
Sorbonne Nouvelle University Paris 3 alumni